EverBlock Systems, LLC. is a modular construction materials company headquartered in New York City, New York, with distribution networks worldwide.  It develops, produces and markets the modular plastic blocks which are used in a variety of construction applications, both personal and commercial.

EverBlock Systems primarily manufactures oversized polypropylene blocks which interlock with each other in order to create furniture, modify interior space, or create new structures.  The blocks are similar in structure and utility to the toy bricks manufactured by The Lego Group, which has generated significant interest among customers who played with the plastic bricks as children.

Applications 
The building materials can be assembled in any way they builder chooses.  The company provides some templates which would allow the builders to create household furniture such as shelving units, tables, desks, catering stations, and bars.  Some commercial applications have included using the blocks to construct interior building partitions, where larger spaces can be divided into multiple workspaces, cubicles, and entire offices.

The blocks are also marketed as potentially having utility as a way to establish disaster relief shelters which can be quickly created and later dis-assembled for reuse in another location.  In an interview with Wired Magazine, company founder, Arnon Rosan, stated "You could drop two pallets of these by helicopter and the next thing you know you have a solid, rigid structure."

References

Further reading

External links
 

Companies based in New York City
Building materials companies of the United States